Bog-wood (also spelled bogwood or bog wood), also known as abonos and, especially amongst pipe smokers, as morta, is a material from trees that have been buried in peat bogs and preserved from decay by the acidic and anaerobic bog conditions, sometimes for hundreds or even thousands of years.  The wood is usually stained brown by tannins dissolved in the acidic water. Bog-wood represents the early stages in the fossilisation of wood, with further stages ultimately forming jet, lignite and coal over a period of many millions of years. Bog-wood may come from any tree species naturally growing near or in bogs, including oak (Quercus – "bog oak"), pine (Pinus), yew (Taxus), swamp cypress (Taxodium) and kauri (Agathis). Bog-wood is often removed from fields and placed in clearance cairns. It is a rare form of timber that is claimed to be "comparable to some of the world's most expensive tropical hardwoods".

Formation process
Bog-wood is created from the trunks of  trees that have lain in bogs, and bog-like conditions such as lakes, river bottoms and swamps, for centuries and even millennia. Deprived of oxygen, the wood undergoes the process of fossilization.

Water flow and depth play a special role in the creation of bog-wood. Currents bind the minerals and iron in the water with tannins in the wood, naturally staining the wood in the process. This centuries-long process, often termed "maturation," turns the wood from golden-brown to completely black, while increasing its hardness to such a level that it can only be carved with the use of specialty cutting tools.

While the time necessary for the oak to transform into bog-wood varies, the "maturation" commonly lasts thousands of years. Due to the ecological reasons mentioned above, no two trunks can be found of the same color.

Excavation sites

Sites of high quality bog-wood in the world are very rare. In the sites expected to yield it, bog-wood is hard to find, and access to the river bank and its bed is often difficult. Therefore, extensive preparations and the engagement of professional divers are necessary for bog-wood recovery. Bog-wood is located in conditions of total darkness, and its extraction marks its first exposure to light after centuries of entombment.

In England and Ireland, the three main types of bog-wood that can be found are yew, oak and pine. Reserves of the ancient wood can also be found in Russia and Ukraine, where the northern region has a climate favorable to the growth of oak.

In Croatia, bog-wood is typically found in the valley of the Sava River and its tributaries. The age of bog-wood found in Croatian rivers ranges from several hundred years in the southern rivers to the oldest retrieved so far, from the Krapina River, dated at 8290 years old.

In Serbia, bog-wood over 8,000 years old is found in the valleys of the Danube River, Sava River and their tributaries, primarily in the province of Vojvodina.

Saving the wood for further processing is a very delicate matter. Extracted logs must be wrapped in waterproof material and meticulously dried to prevent warping. The process of wood desiccation is complex, and despite great care, most of the raw wood is unsuitable for further processing. For this reason, the price of high quality raw bog-wood is quite high.

Aesthetics
Bog-wood is characterized by natural staining and variations in color, and the direction of growth rings. Well preserved bog-wood is not affected by weather conditions or organisms which would change its strength and appearance.
Semi-dry bog-wood is sometimes of a golden or copper color, or with a tint of some other hue, and is exceptionally hard. Older wood can be completely black, yet possess the rich variations in hue characteristic of “live” wood. This dark hue is a special feature of bog-wood as a construction material, whether it is used for the making of semi-manufactured goods, veneer or planks.

Uses

Because bog-wood can remain free of decay for thousands of years it is of use in dendrochronology, often providing records much older than living trees. Wooden artifacts lost or buried in bogs become preserved as bog-wood, and are important in archaeology.

Bog-wood may be used in joinery to make furniture or wood carving.  Bog-wood sometimes has aesthetically interesting shapes (similar to driftwood) and may be used as ornaments. As bog-wood dries out, it may crack or split, but this does not necessarily detract from its aesthetic qualities. Due to its natural color, it is a traditionally favored wood for the carving of dirks (bìodagan) and sgian-dubh in the Scottish Highlands.

Bog-wood is used in aquaria for ornaments, providing hiding places for fish and a growing surface for plants such as Java fern. Additionally, the leaching of organic compounds such as tannins into the water causes a brown coloration.

During the nineteenth century bog oak was used to make carved decorative items such as jewelry and in some parts of the world it is still used to craft unique artifacts. Prized in the Tudor period for its dark hue, bog oak was used to construct the throne of Peter the Great as well in the construction of Venetian palaces and the bedroom suite of Louis XIV.

One of the uses of bog-wood is for making of tobacco pipes. It is an ideal material because of a high percentage of minerals, reaching up to 12%, which makes bog-wood especially resistant to burning. Because underground currents erase all traces of tannin, resin and similar ingredients in bog-wood, pipes constructed of the ancient wood provide a neutral taste during tobacco smoking. Due to the challenges of extraction and processing, today there are a relatively small number of pipemakers who make pipes out of bog-wood.

In addition to pipes, bog-wood has traditionally been used to construct decorative objects and items for everyday use. Today, modern drying techniques have made it possible to preserve larger planks of bog oak that are suitable for floor coverings, furniture, doors, window frames, and sculptures.

See also
Aquarium substrates
Driftwood
Mopane wood, recovered from deserts and often sold as an alternative to bogwood for aquaria; it is sometimes incorrectly labelled as bogwood or charred bogwood.
Swamp kauri
Sweet Track, a timber causeway in Somerset, England, its timbers preserved in waterlogged ground for over 5,800 years.

References

External links

Irish Peatland Conservation Council - Information sheet on bogwood and its formation in Irish peat bogs.

Aquariums
Bogs
Dendrology
Fishkeeping
Organic gemstones
Wood